Belconnen Town Centre is located in the suburb of Belconnen on the south-western shore of Lake Ginninderra in Canberra, Australia. It is the town centre for the Belconnen district.

Belconnen Town Centre contains several Federal and Territory government departments, as well as retail and commercial facilities. A large Westfield shopping mall is located within the centre as are many other smaller retail outlets including the Belconnen fresh food markets. The centre also contains several car dealerships. Residential apartments are located within the centre as well as in the surrounding parts of the suburb of Belconnen. The centre also contains a public library, health centre, town park, community facilities and a bus interchange. Belconnen Town Centre also offers events to local residents

Government departments are housed in office buildings including the Benjamin Offices and award-winning Cameron Offices - an example of Brutalist architecture. These include the Department of Immigration and Border Protection, the Australian Bureau of Statistics and the Australian Communications and Media Authority.

References

External links

Canberra urban places